The .35 Whelen is a powerful medium-bore rifle cartridge that does not require a magnum action or a magnum bolt-face. This cartridge is more powerful than its parent, especially in killing power on large game. However, with much wider availability, and the higher BC (ballistic coefficient) .30 caliber bullets of today, the power gap between the two cartridges has been decreased.

History

The .35 Whelen was developed in 1922 as a wildcat cartridge. Remington Arms Company standardized the cartridge as a regular commercial round and first made it available in the Remington model 700 Classic in 1988. It has since been chambered by other arms makers in bolt-action, semi-automatic, and single-shot rifles. It has a modest but steady following among big game hunters in North America.

One version of its origin is that it was designed by Colonel Townsend Whelen when he was commanding officer of the Frankford Arsenal. In a 1923 issue of American Rifleman Col. Whelen refers to it as "the first cartridge that I designed" and states that, "Mr. James V. Howe undertook this work of making dies, reamers, chambering tools, and of chambering the rifles, all in accordance with my design." James V. Howe was a toolmaker at the Arsenal and later a founder of Griffin & Howe.

In his 1940 book The Hunting Rifle: Design, Selection, Ballistics, Marksmanship, Col. Whelen gives a different version of its origin after describing the .400 Whelen.

About the time we completed development of this cartridge, I went on a long hunting trip in the Northwest, and when I returned, Mr. Howe showed me another cartridge he had developed. The .30-06 case was necked to .35 caliber to use existing .35-caliber bullets. Mr. Howe asked my permission to call this cartridge the .35 Whelen, but he alone deserves credit for its development. Handloader’s Digest, New Seventh Edition, Edited by John T. Amber. Page(s) 120 & 121.  Library of Congress Catalog# 62-15069 Copyright 1975

35 Whelen

The 35 Whelen was designed by James Howe, of Griffin and Howe, partially in response to letters from Leslie Simpson and Stewart Edward White, suggesting that a good all-round rifle for African use would be one of 333 to 350 caliber, with a bullet of 250- to 300 grains (ideally 275 at 2500 fps. Both men (along with Roy Chapman Andrews and the Rev. Dr. Harry Caldwell, who were active in Asia,) perhaps the finest big game shots our country has produced, were aware of the outstanding performance of the 318 Westley-Richards with a 250-grain bullet, the 333 Jeffrey with a 300-grain bullet and the 350 Rigby with a 310-grain bullet on thin-skinned dangerous and non-dangerous game in Africa. It is of passing interest that the bullet for the old British 333 Jeffery is much like the 300-grain copper tube bullet which Winchester introduced for the 338 Magnum.
The 35 Whelen was the first of  3 (three) efforts by Griffin and Howe to produce a cartridge that would meet this ideal. All were in 35 caliber. The 35 Whelen is simply the 30-06 necked up to 35 caliber and it’s about as easy to form from '06 brass as is the 270. Later, an "improved" version of the 35 Whelen, with venturi shoulders like Weatherby cartridges, was made up, but it never caught on. The 35 Whelen, now available in several factory rounds, and factory chambered in several different rifles (although some gunsmiths still sell properly formed brass for it) has racked up a tremendous record all over the world, rivaling the 375 Holland and Holland in its effectiveness. It was originally designed, partially, as a substitute for the 375 H & H, since rifles for it could be made up using inexpensive 30-06 actions rather than costly magnum-length Mauser Actions It has killed, with aplomb and efficiency, all of the trophy animals in the world, with the possible exception of the “Big Three” (elephant, rhinoceros, and cape buffalo.) It can be loaded down to 35 Remington speeds for light recoil and pot-shooting, or loaded up to provide terrific stopping power--more than should ever be needed by a competent rifleman facing American big game. Although not legal in certain parts of Africa for dangerous game (some countries require that rifles of at least 375 or 400 caliber be used,) solid nose bullets are available so that, in a pinch, it would probably serve. It is easy to rebarrel an action to this cartridge-- it does not even require opening up the bolt face or free-boring; the rimless brass for it, as with the 358, is cheaper and easier to manufacture than the belted brass necessary for the 350 Remington, 35 Griffin and Howe (or Holland and Holland, as it is sometimes known) and 358 Norma Magnum. There is still a great future awaiting the 35 Whelen and, now that the 22-250 has been legitimized, perhaps we can hope that the 35 Whelen will meet the same good fortune.

Rifle: Win. Mod. 70 

Custom Barrel: 24" in.
   
Twist: 1-16 

CASES: Brass, Gov’t Issue

Most people think that the .35 Whelen cartridge, which is a .30/06 case necked up to .35 caliber, was designed by Colonel Townsend Whelen. As a matter of fact, it was only named for Colonel Whelen, but was designed by James Howe, who was then with the famous firm of Griffin and Howe.

The cartridge was designed in the early 1920s at a time when the only way to get a .375 Magnum was to have one built up on the long expensive Magnum Mauser action. The great advantage of the .35 Whelen was that this was a cartridge that could handle heavy bullets and yet could be used on short actions like 98 Mauser and the Springfield.

Because .30/06 cases are cheap and plentiful and because good bullets like those made by Speer Inc. in 35 caliber are available, the 35 Whelen still retains considerable popularity. However, there are probably fewer .35 Whelens in use today than there were back in the 1920s and early 1930s, because with a minimum of fuss and bother one can get a factory Winchester Model 70 in .375 caliber. That great cartridge, of course, will beat the .35 Whelen on every count.

However, the man who has a yen for a rifle using heavy bullets of fairly large diameter at good velocities can’t go wrong on a .35 Whelen, if he is a handloader—and of course, he is a handloader or he would not be reading this book.

There are two varieties of the .35 Whelen and maybe more. The original cartridge had a short shoulder with the same slope as that of the .30/06. The so-called improved version has a sharper shoulder which theoretically at least will maintain headspace against the blow of the firing pin better.

Performance
Using a  bullet, the .35 Whelen will generate  at the muzzle from a  barrel.

The .35 Whelen is not the ballistic twin of the .350 Remington Magnum and falls about 500 foot-pounds short. With the correct bullet choice, this cartridge is suitable for virtually all thin-skinned large and dangerous game. The European designation for this cartridge would be 9 × 63 mm; with its wide bullet selection and high muzzle energy it is in the same echelon as the 9.3×62mm.

See also
 .30-06 Springfield wildcat cartridges
 .338 Winchester Magnum
 .350 Remington Magnum
 .358 Norma Magnum
 .358 Winchester
 .375 H&H Magnum
 9.3×62mm
 9.3×74mmR
 9.3×64mm Brenneke
 9 mm caliber
 List of rifle cartridges
 Table of handgun and rifle cartridges

References

External links
 Top Handloads for the .35 Whelen
 Reload Bench - .35 Whelen
 Reloaders Nest - .35 Whelen
 Guns & Shooting Online - .35 Whelen

Pistol and rifle cartridges
Wildcat cartridges
Remington Arms cartridges